Veryan is a village and parish in Cornwall, England, UK.

Veryan may also refer to:

Nora Veryán (1929–1998), a Mexican film actress
Patricia Veryan, a writer of historical romance fiction 
Veryan Pappin (born 1958), a Scottish field hockey player
Veryan Weston, a pianist

See also
Veryan Bay, a bay on the south coast of Cornwall
HMS Veryan Bay (K651), a ship of the Royal Navy